The Fisherville Historic District is a historic district encompassing one of the four 19th century industrial villages of Grafton, Massachusetts.  The area's first industrial activity was in 1831–2, when Peter Farnum (who had a mill at Farnumsville) and business partners built a brick mill there.  A densely packed residential area grew around the mill complex, which achieved its present configuration c. 1909.  The largest period of growth in terms of residential housing was in the last two decades of the 19th century, when a significant number of Italianate and Queen Anne worker houses were built.

The district was listed on the National Register of Historic Places in 1996.

See also
National Register of Historic Places listings in Worcester County, Massachusetts
Farnumsville Historic District

References

Historic districts in Worcester County, Massachusetts
Grafton, Massachusetts
National Register of Historic Places in Worcester County, Massachusetts
Historic districts on the National Register of Historic Places in Massachusetts